Nova Porteirinha is a municipality in the north of the state of Minas Gerais in Brazil. It became a municipality in 1997. The postal code (CEP) is 39525-000.

Nova Porteirinha is part of the statistical microregion of Janaúba.  It is surrounded by the municipalities of Janaúba and Porteirinha.  
It is across the Rio Gorutuba from the city of Janaúba.

The main economic activities are cattle raising (4,700 head in 2006) and farming with  a large production of bananas and modest production of tropical fruits, sugarcane, corn, and coconuts. Cropland made up  and natural pasture  hectares. There were only 59 tractors, a ratio of one for every 10 farms. In the urban area there were no financial institutions as of 2006. There were 171 automobiles, giving a ratio of about one automobile for every 42 inhabitants. The Gross Domestic Product was R$ 40,300,000 (2005), which was mainly generated by services. Health care was provided by 6 public health clinics. There were no hospitals as of 2005.

Municipal Human Development Index
MHDI: .685 (2000)
State ranking: 613 out of 853 municipalities as of 2000
National ranking: 3,664 out of 5,138 municipalities as of 2000
Life expectancy: 67.8
Literacy rate: 77.0
Combined primary, secondary and tertiary gross enrollment ratio: .773
Per capita income (monthly): R$114.51 (For the complete list see Frigoletto)

See also
List of municipalities in Minas Gerais

References

IBGE

Municipalities in Minas Gerais